Gonzalo Agustín Vega González (November 29, 1946 – October 10, 2016) was a Mexican film, theatre and television actor.

Personal life 
He was also father of the actresses Zuria Vega, Marimar Vega and a son, Gonzalo Vega Jr.

In 2010 he was diagnosed with preleukemia and retired from acting. He returned to acting in 2014, after a marked improvement in health.

Filmography

Films

Television

References

External links 

1946 births
2016 deaths
20th-century Mexican male actors
21st-century Mexican male actors
Best Actor Ariel Award winners
Male actors from Mexico City
Mexican male film actors
Mexican male stage actors
Mexican male telenovela actors
Deaths from myelodysplastic syndrome